Grass refers to the many species of plants in the family Poaceae.

Grass may also refer to:

Plants
 Grass is also commonly used in the names of other plants, some but not all with narrow leaves, including:
Blue-eyed grasses, Sisyrinchium in the family Iridaceae
China grass, Boehmeria nivea, a nettle grown for fibre, in family Urticaceae
Cotton grass, Eriophorum spp., in family Cyperaceae.
Deergrass (disambiguation): 
Rhexia spp., in family Melastomataceae
Trichophorum spp., in family Cyperaceae, particularly Trichophorum cespitosum
Ditch grass, Ruppia maritima, in family Ruppiaceae
Eelgrass:
Zostera in family Zosteraceae
Vallisneria in family Hydrocharitaceae
Golden-eye grass, Curculigo orchioides, in family Hypoxidaceae
Good Friday Grass, Luzula campestris, in family Juncaceae.
Goosegrass, Galium aparine in the family Rubiaceae
Grass (cannabis), a slang name for cannabis (drug)
Grass of Parnassus, Parnassia, in family Celastraceae
Knotgrass, Polygonum spp., in family Polygonaceae
Mondo grass, Ophiopogon japonicus, in family Asparagaceae
Nutgrass, Cyperus rotundus, in family Cyperaceae
Pepper grass, Lepidium spp., in family Brassicaceae
Sawgrass, Cladium spp., in family Cyperaceae
Scurvy-grass, Cochlearia spp., in family Brassicaceae
Scurvy-grass sorrel, Oxalis enneaphylla in family Oxalidaceae
Seagrasses in four families, Posidoniaceae, Zosteraceae, Hydrocharitaceae, or Cymodoceaceae
Sleeping grass, Mimosa pudica, in family Fabaceae
Whitlow grass, Draba and Erophila spp., in family Brassicaceae:
Xyridaceae, known as the yellow-eyed grass family

People with the surname
Alex Grass (1927–2009), American businessman and lawyer 
Arthur Grass (1897–1994), English-born Brazilian cricketer
Frank J. Grass (born 1951), American general 
Günter Grass (1927–2015), German author and playwright, Nobel Prize in Literature 1999
John Grass (1837–1918), Native American Lakota leader
Philippe Grass (1801–1876), French sculptor
Vincent Grass (born 1949), Belgian actor

Places
Grass Mountain (Vermont)
Grass Range, Montana
Grass Valley, California

Art, entertainment, and media

Film
 Grass (1925 film), a documentary about the Bakhtiari tribe of Iran
 Grass (1999 film), a documentary about marijuana
 Grass (1968), an independent film by Clarke Mackey
 Grass (2018 film), a South Korean film

Games
 Grass (card game), a cannabis-themed card game similar to Mille Bornes

Literature
 Grass (novel), a novel in The Arbai Trilogy  by Sheri Tepper
 "Grass", a poem by Patti Smith from her 1978 book Babel
 "Grass", a poem by Carl Sandburg

Music
 "Grass", Russian art song by Aleksandr Yegorovich Varlamov (1801-1848)
 Grass (album), a 2005 album by Keller Williams
 "Grass" (Animal Collective song), a single by the band Animal Collective
 "Grass" (XTC song), a 1986 single by XTC, written Moulding, from the Skylarking album
 "Grass" (Robert Wyatt song) single, words by poet Ivor Cutler 1981

Television
 Grass (TV series), a BBC television series

Computing and technology
 GRASS (programming language), a programming language used for animations
 GRASS GIS, a geographic information system
 Gradient Recall Acquisition using Steady States, a form of magnetic resonance imaging

Slang usage
 Grass, grasser or Supergrass (informant) in the UK, an informant, especially one criminal informing on another, to the police or other authorities.
 Grass, an informal name for marijuana.

Other uses of the above
 Grass dance, a Native American style of pow wow dancing

See also
 Gras (disambiguation) 
 Grasse, a commune in the Alpes-Maritimes department (of which it is a sub-prefecture), on the French Riviera